Dysart Unified School District is a school district in Maricopa County, Arizona. It has 24,000 pre-kindergarten through 12th grade students in the Northwest Phoenix Metropolitan area.  The district encompasses , serving parts of El Mirage, Glendale, Surprise, Youngtown, and Maricopa County.  The district is home to twenty K-8 schools, four comprehensive high schools, and one alternative program.  The district has AdvancED Accreditation, the NCA Model School District Award, NSBA Technology Spotlight Award, and is home to a national elementary school principal of the year and two Arizona teachers of the year.

History 
The district was founded by Nathaniel Martin Dysart. He sold his land and created the governing board so that his daughter did not have to walk 5 miles to the nearest school.  Prior to 2001, the district had only five elementary schools, and one high school. However, due to the exponential growth of the Surprise and El Mirage, the district became one of the fastest growing districts in Arizona. In the 2000s, the district built at least one school per year and by the end of the 2000s, the district had a total of twenty-four schools.

Schools 
Starting in the 2021-2022 school year, Dysart remade eight of their existing schools into middle and elementary schools for 5th-8th, and K-4th grade.

K-4 schools 

 Countryside Elementary School - (Surprise)
 El Mirage Elementary School - (El Mirage)
 Rancho Gabriela Elementary School - (Surprise)
 Western Peaks Elementary School - (Surprise)

5-8 schools 

 Ashton Ranch Middle School - (Surprise)
 Cimarron Springs Middle School - (Surprise)
 Dysart Middle School - (El Mirage)
 Sonoran Heights Middle School - (Surprise)

K-8 schools
Asante Preparatory Academy (Formerly Desert Moon School) - (Surprise) 
Canyon Ridge School - (Surprise)
Freedom Traditional Academy - (Surprise)
Kingswood Elementary School - (Surprise)
Luke Elementary School - (Glendale)
Marley Park Elementary School - (Surprise)
Mountain View School - (Waddell)
Riverview Elementary School - (El Mirage)
Sunset Hills Elementary School - (Surprise)
Surprise Elementary School - (El Mirage)
Thompson Ranch Elementary School - (El Mirage)
West Point Elementary School - (Surprise)

High schools
Dysart High School - (El Mirage)
Shadow Ridge High School - (Surprise)
Valley Vista High School (Arizona) - (Surprise)
Willow Canyon High School - (Surprise)

References

Dysart Unified School District https://www.dysart.org/

School districts in Maricopa County, Arizona
Education in Surprise, Arizona
1920 establishments in Arizona
School districts established in 1920